Esperanto and Ido are constructed international auxiliary languages, with Ido being an Esperantido derived from Esperanto and Reformed Esperanto. The number of speakers is estimated at 100 thousand to 2 million for Esperanto, whereas Ido is much fewer at 100 to 1 thousand.

Esperanto was developed by L. L. Zamenhof, who published it in 1887 under the pseudonym Dr Esperanto. It immediately became popular, but soon the members of the movements were making suggestions as to how they thought it might be improved. Zamenhof responded by making a list of possible changes to Esperanto and in 1894 put them before the Esperanto community. If accepted they would create what Dr Zamenhof called a "Reformed Esperanto". This proposed reformed Esperanto is sometimes referred to as Esperanto 1894. However, when the Esperanto community was invited to vote on whether to adopt the proposals, they rejected the proposals by a large majority.

Ido was created around a quarter of a century after Esperanto. The name Ido means "offspring" in Esperanto and was so named by its creators because it was a development of Esperanto. The creation of Ido led to a schism between those who believed that Esperanto should be left as it was and those who believed that it had what they perceived as inherent flaws which made it not quite good enough to be the world's international auxiliary language.  Those who opposed change maintained that it was endless tinkering that had led, in their opinion, to the decline of Volapük, a once popular constructed language that had predated Esperanto's publication by a few years. They also cited the rejection of Zamenhof's 1894 reform proposals.

The languages of Esperanto and Ido remain close, and largely mutually intelligible, like two dialects of the same language. Just as dialects of a language are quite often sources of new words for that language through literature, so Ido has contributed many neologisms to Esperanto (especially in poetic substitutes for long words using the mal- prefix).

Summary of differences

History 

Calls for specific reforms to Esperanto were made almost from the beginning, and so Dr. L. L. Zamenhof published suggestions for reform in 1894. Publication took the form of a series of four articles (including a list of words singled out for possible change) in La Esperantisto monthly magazine, under the title Pri Reformoj en Esperanto.  It was put to the vote whether this should be implemented in full or in part, or reworked or rejected. A big majority voted to reject it outright. It seems likely that, having learned Esperanto, speakers did not want to unlearn it. Because so many voted no Zamenhof took no further interest in changing Esperanto and concentrated instead on the work of Fundamenta Esperanto.

It was a time of great interest in constructed languages and several people published artificial languages of their own creation. It was obviously desirable that one from among the constructed languages should be chosen as the international language. In 1900 Louis Couturat, a French mathematician, after initial correspondence with Zamenhof created the Delegation for the Adoption of an International Auxiliary Language.  The Delegation approached the International Association of Academies, based in Vienna, in 1907, requesting it to choose between the many artificial languages. This request was denied. The Delegation's response was to meet later that year (1907) in Paris as a committee under the chairmanship of Louis Couturat with the intention of deciding the issue themselves.

One of the languages under consideration was, of course, Esperanto. Zamenhof did not give permission to reprint his articles detailing his "Esperanto 1894" suggestions but a reprint was made and circulated, perhaps predisposing Committee members to think in terms of a reformed Esperanto. (There were 200 copies, distributed personally.)  The Committee began its deliberations to choose an international auxiliary language from among the several entries. Most Esperantists assumed Esperanto would win easily. However, an anonymous entry was submitted at the last moment (against the rules) detailing a reformed version of Esperanto, which may have impressed the Committee. Louis Couturat as chairman demanded the Committee finalize its business within a month, and only five members were involved in making the final decision. Of the five, one abstained and four voted for Esperanto but said it must be reformed.

Many in the Esperanto movement felt betrayed. It later was discovered that the anonymous last-minute entrant was Louis de Beaufront, previously the chairman of the French Esperanto movement and chosen by Zamenhof himself to present the case for Esperanto. People believed Louis Couturat had been well aware of what was going on. To this day there is much bewilderment in both the Esperanto and Ido communities about the rules and proceedings of the Committee.

Zamenhof refused to be involved in making changes to Esperanto but a group led by Louis Couturat elaborated on Ido as a "Reformed Esperanto". There was much bitterness on both sides. Louis Couturat polemicised against Esperanto until his early death in a car crash in 1914. His loss was a great setback to those who wished to spread Ido.

Not everyone involved in creating Ido was satisfied with it; many former Idists, such as Otto Jespersen (who created Novial) left the movement, bleeding Ido of leaders.

Of all synthetic auxiliary languages, only Esperanto and Interlingua-IL de ApI gained a sizeable following and textual corpus to this day.

Esperanto is based on the Fundamento de Esperanto by L. L. Zamenhof; whereas the grammar of Ido is explained in the Kompleta Gramatiko Detaloza di la Linguo Internaciona Ido.

Modern situation and influence of Ido in Esperanto 
Since Esperanto has proved to be a living, stable language, nowadays Esperantists are less quick to reject influences from Ido. Probably the most fundamental of these is that Esperantists have copied Idists in clarifying the rules for word derivation. In addition, modern Esperanto has borrowed the suffixes -oz- (meaning "abundant in") and -end- (meaning "required to") from Ido.

Especially poets have used the Ido equivalents of Esperanto's "mal-" word class ("Contrary of").

Proposals for an Utrum into Esperanto 
One difference between the two languages is that Ido has an extra utrum third person singular pronoun, i.e. that means "he or she". For various reasons, this is seen as desirable in Esperanto too by many Esperantists.

Some Esperantists have suggested  as a replacement for all singular 3rd person pronouns. The suggested innovation is called , but the total replacement of li, ŝi and ĝi is seen too radical.

In 1967, however, Manuel Halvelik already included the additional utrum  in Arcaicam Esperantom (keeping  as masculine pronoun), thus inadvertently founding .

An attempt to elevate the neutrum  as utrum has not gained acceptance at all, as a ne-utrum ("none of both") is the contrary of the desired utrum ("any of both").

Modern view of Esperantists towards proposed changes 
Other suggested innovations such as Iĉismo (to have a neutral root and masculine and feminine endings) are more acceptable and are discussed among Esperantists. The Volapük experience still is a factor in the "protectionism" of Esperantists, but no longer predominant. Still, proposals for change are seen in Esperanto with much more suspicion than in natural languages.

The present day attitude is shown by the Esperanto Encyclopedia where it states that reforms, i.e. changing the fundaments of a language, have never been successful neither in Esperanto nor anywhere else, while evolution through use "enriches languages".

Alphabet

Phonology 

Ido's rule for determining stress is regular, but slightly more complex than Esperanto's. In Esperanto, all words are stressed on the penultimate, second-to-last syllable: radio, televido. In Ido all polysyllables are stressed on the second-to-last syllable except for verb infinitives, which are stressed on the last syllable. If an i or u precedes another vowel, the pair is considered part of the same syllable when applying the accent rule, unless the two vowels are the only ones in the word, in which case the "i" or "u" is stressed.

Orthography 
Esperanto eliminates the letters ‹q›, ‹w›, ‹x›, and ‹y› from the 26-letter Latin alphabet and adds the new letters ‹ĉ›, ‹ĝ›, ‹ĥ›, ‹ĵ›, ‹ŝ› and ‹ŭ›. Ido uses the 26-letter alphabet without changes, substituting digraphs for Esperanto's diacritics. While words in both Ido and Esperanto are spelled exactly as they are pronounced, the presence of digraphs means that Ido does not have the one-to-one correspondence between letters and sounds that Esperanto has. However, Ido's digraphs are more recognizable to speakers of Romance languages and its avoidance of diacritics guarantees that any computer system that supports English could easily be used for Ido.

The Fundamento de Esperanto does allow the use of the digraphs ‹ch›, ‹gh›, ‹hh›, ‹jh›, ‹sh› and the single letter ‹u› instead of the ordinary diacritical letters of Esperanto when those are unavailable. With the advent of computers, another system of surrogate Esperanto writing using ‹cx›, ‹gx›, ‹hx›, ‹jx›, ‹sx› and ‹ux› was introduced. It however remains unofficial.

In general, the letter  in Esperanto becomes h or k in Ido. The letters ĝ and ĵ are merged into j (which has the sound of "s" in "leisure") while ĉ, ŝ, ŭ, ks/kz, and kv respectively become ch, sh, w, x, and qu.

Morphology 

Both in Ido and in Esperanto, each word is built from a root word. A word consists of a root and a grammatical ending. Other words can be formed from that word by removing the grammatical ending and adding a new one, or by inserting certain affixes between the root and the grammatical ending.

Some of the grammatical endings of the two languages are defined as follows:

Most of these endings are the same as in Esperanto except for -i, -ir, -ar, -or and -ez. Esperanto marks noun plurals by an agglutinative ending -j (so plural nouns end in -oj), uses -i for verb infinitives (Esperanto infinitives are tenseless), and uses -u for the imperative. Verbs in both Esperanto and Ido do not conjugate depending on person, number or gender; the -as, -is, and -os endings suffice whether the subject is I, you, he, she, they, or anything else.

Both languages have the same grammatical rules concerning nouns (ending with -o), adjectives (ending with -a) and many other aspects. (However, the relationship between nouns, verbs and adjectives underwent a number of changes with Ido, based on the principle of reversibility.) In both languages one can see a direct relationship between the words multa "many" and multo "a multitude" by simply replacing the adjectival -a with a nominal -o, or the other way around.

Some minor differences include the loss of adjectival agreement, and the change of the plural from an agglutinative -j tacked onto the end to a synthetic replacement of the terminal -o with an -i. Hence, Esperanto belaj hundoj ("beautiful dogs") becomes Ido bela hundi. Ido also does away with the direct object ending -n in sentences where the subject precedes the object, so Esperanto mi amas la belajn hundojn ("I love the beautiful dogs") would in Ido become me amas la bela hundi.

Greater differences arise, however, with the derivations of many words. For example, in Esperanto, the noun krono means "a crown", and by replacing the nominal o with a verbal i one derives the verb kroni "to crown". However, if one were to begin with the verb kroni, "to crown", and replace the verbal i with a nominal o to create a noun, the resulting meaning would not be "a coronation", but rather the original "crown". This is because the root kron- is inherently a noun: With the nominal ending -o the word simply means the thing itself, whereas with the verbal -i it means an action performed with the thing. To get the name for the performance of the action, it is necessary to use the suffix -ado, which retains the verbal idea. Thus it is necessary to know which part of speech each Esperanto root belongs to.

Ido introduced a number of suffixes in an attempt to clarify the morphology of a given word, so that the part of speech of the root would not need to be memorized. In the case of the word krono "a crown", the suffix -izar "to cover with" is added to create the verb kronizar "to crown". From this verb it is possible to remove the verbal -ar and replace it with a nominal -o, creating the word kronizo "a coronation". By not allowing a noun to be used directly as a verb, as in Esperanto, Ido verbal roots can be recognized without the need to memorize them.

Ido corresponds more overtly to the expectations of the Romance languages, whereas Esperanto is more heavily influenced by Slavic semantics and phonology.

Syntax 

Ido word order is generally the same as Esperanto (subject–verb–object). The Ido sentence Me havas la blua libro ("I have the blue book") is the same as the Esperanto Mi havas la bluan libron, both in meaning and word order. There are a few differences, however:
 In both Esperanto and Ido, adjectives can precede the noun as in English, or follow the noun as in Spanish. Thus, in Ido, Me havas la libro blua means the same thing.
 Ido has the accusative suffix -n, but unlike Esperanto, this suffix is only required when the object of the sentence is not clear, for example, when the subject-verb-object word order is not followed. Thus,  the Ido sentence La blua libron me havas also means the same thing.

Unlike Esperanto, Ido does not impose rules of grammatical agreement between grammatical categories within a sentence. Adjectives do not have to be pluralized: in Ido the large books would be la granda libri as opposed to la grandaj libroj in Esperanto.

Vocabulary 

Although Esperanto and Ido share a large amount of vocabulary, there are differences. The creators of Ido felt that much of Esperanto was either not internationally recognizable, or unnecessarily deformed, and aimed to fix these with more "international" or "corrected" roots. This reform can sometimes be at the expense of Esperanto's simpler word-building process. Below are some examples in Esperanto, Ido and English; with French, German, Italian, Spanish and Portuguese for linguistic comparison:*

* Note that Spanish, Portuguese, Italian, and French are Romance languages, while German and English are Germanic languages. English has also had large influences from French and Latin.In comparison, Esperanto is somewhat more influenced by German vocabulary and Slavic semantics (as in the case of prefix mal-), and has more priority over word compounding by affixes.

Gender 
Another part of the reform is that Ido, unlike Esperanto, does not assume the male gender in roots such as for family. For example, Ido does not derive the word for waitress by adding a feminine suffix to waiter, as Esperanto does to derive it from neutral to only feminine. Instead, Ido words are defined as gender neutral, and two different suffixes derive masculine and feminine words from the root: servisto for a waiter of any gender, servistulo for a male waiter, and servistino for a waitress. There are only two exceptions to this rule: First, patro for father, matro for mother, and genitoro for parent, and second, viro for man, muliero for woman, and adulto for adult.

Most Esperanto words are gender-neutral ("table", "grass", etc.). However, Esperanto assumes the male gender by default in other words, mainly words dealing with familial relationships and some animals. These words can be made female with the use of the feminine suffix. In Ido there is no default gender for normal root words, and one simply adds the corresponding masculine or feminine suffix only when desired. For example, frato means "brother" in Esperanto, but "sibling" in Ido. Ido uses the suffixes -ino ("female", used as in Esperanto) and -ulo ("male", not to be confused with the same Esperanto suffix which means "person"). Thus "sister" is fratino (the same as Esperanto), but brother is fratulo. "Sibling" and other gender neutral forms are especially difficult in Esperanto since Esperanto simply does not have a word for such gender neutral forms. Esperanto does, however, have an epicene prefix that indicates "both sexes together": ge-. Patro means "father" and patrino "mother"; gepatroj means "parents". In standard usage gepatro cannot be used in the singular to indicate a parent of unknown gender; one would say instead unu el la gepatroj, "one (out) of the parents".

There is a nonstandard suffix in Esperanto that means "male": -iĉo (see Gender reform in Esperanto).  There is also an existing prefix, vir-, with the same meaning, used for animals.

A few exceptions exist in Ido's gender system as described above, which avoid its suffix system, for which it was decided that the feminine words were so much more recognizable to its source languages: viro ("man"), muliero ("woman"), patro ("father"), and matro ("mother"). Compare these with Esperanto viro, virino, patro, and patrino, respectively. Ido also has several other neutral-gender words, such as genitoro for "parent". Gepatri in Ido means the same as Esperanto gepatroj (i.e. "parents" of both genders); genitori means "parents" in the English sense, not making any implication of gender whatsoever.

Other words, such as amiko ("friend"), are neutral in Esperanto as well as Ido.

Unasenceso 
Another principle of Ido is Unasenceso or "one sensedness." This means each Ido root is supposed to correspond to only one meaning. Ido proponents feel that this allows for more precise expression than in Esperanto.

Mal- 
Ido claims the prefix mal- (creating a word with the exact opposite meaning) in Esperanto to be overused as a prefix, and also to be inappropriate since it has negative meanings in many languages, and introduces des- as an alternative in such cases. Ido also uses a series of opposite words in lieu of a prefix. For example, instead of malbona ("bad", the opposite of bona, "good"), Ido uses mala, or instead of mallonga ("short", the opposite of longa, "long"), kurta. Listening comprehension was also given as a reason: the primary Ido grammar book states that one reason for the adoption of the Latin-based sinistra for "left" instead of maldextra (mal- plus the word dextra, or dekstra for "right") is that often only the last one or two syllables can be heard when shouting commands. Esperanto has developed alternate forms for many of these words (such as liva for maldekstra), but most of these are rarely used.

An extreme example of overuse of the mal- suffix.

Correlatives 
Esperanto adopts a regular scheme of correlatives organized as a table. Ido combines words together and changing word endings with some irregularities to show distinction, which is not as regular as that of Esperanto but is easier to distinguish by ear.

Example
The Ido correlatives were changed so they would be more distinct sounding:

* Note: ĉiujn tiujn, kiuj(n) (all those, which) is more commonly said as ĉiujn, kiuj(n) (all, which) in Esperanto.

Pronouns 
The pronouns of Ido were revised to make them more acoustically distinct than those of Esperanto, which all end in i. Especially the singular and plural first-person pronouns mi and ni may be difficult to distinguish in a noisy environment, so Ido has me and ni instead. Ido also distinguishes between intimate (tu) and formal (vu) second-person singular pronouns as well as plural second-person pronouns (vi) not marked for intimacy. Furthermore, Ido has a pan-gender third-person pronoun lu (it can mean "he", "she", or "it", depending on the context) in addition to its masculine (il), feminine (el), and neuter (ol) third-person pronouns.

Ol, like English it and Esperanto ĝi, is not limited to inanimate objects, but can be used "for entities whose sex is indeterminate: babies, children, humans, youths, elders, people, individuals, horses, cows, cats, etc."

As Esperanto was created in the Russian Empire, "ci"/"tu" in Esperanto and Esperanto 1894 are used / to be used only in very familiar circles and towards children and intellectually inferior creatures/humans; its use faced to a colleague or outside of the family can be seen as outright insulting. Therefore, "ci" is omitted in most basic grammars, as many Esperantists will use their native tongue in situations where "ci"/„tu" were appropriate.

Proper nouns 
Esperanto may or may not "Esperantize" names and proper nouns, depending on many factors. Most standard European names have equivalents, as do many major cities and all nations. Ido, on the other hand, treats most proper nouns as foreign words, and does not render them into Ido.

Personal names 
Many common cross-culture European names have Esperanto equivalents, such as Johano (John, Johann, Juan, Jean, etc.), Aleksandro (Alexander, Aleksandr, Alessandro, etc.), Mario or Maria (Mary, Maria, Marie, etc.), among others. Some Esperanto speakers choose to take on a fully assimilated name, or to at least adjust the orthography of their name to the Esperanto alphabet. Others leave their name completely unmodified. This is regarded as a personal choice, and the Academy of Esperanto officially affirmed this proclaiming that "everyone has the right to keep their authentic name in its original orthography, as long as it is written in Latin letters."

Personal names in Ido, on the other hand, are always left unmodified.

Place names 
Most countries have their own names in Esperanto. The system of derivation, though, is sometimes complex.  Where the country is named after an ethnic group, the main root means a person of that group: anglo is an Englishman, franco is a Frenchman. Originally, names of countries were created by the addition of the suffix -ujo ("container"), hence England and France would be rendered Anglujo and Francujo respectively (literally "container for Englishmen/Frenchmen"). More recently, many Esperantists have adopted -io as the national suffix, thus creating names more in line with standard international practice (and less odd-looking): Anglio, Francio, nevertheless the suffix remains unofficial.

In the New World, where citizens are named for their country, the name of the country is the main word, and its inhabitants are derived from that: Kanado ("Canada"), kanadano ("Canadian").

Names of cities may or may not have an Esperanto equivalent: Londono for London, Nov-Jorko for New York. Place names which lack widespread recognition, or which would be mangled beyond recognition, usually remain in their native form: Cannes is usually rendered as Cannes.

In Ido, continents have their own names: Europa, Amerika (divided in Nord-Amerika and Sud-Amerika), Azia, Afrika, Oceania and Antarktika.

In Ido, country names must conform to the language's orthography but otherwise many are left unchanged:  Peru, Portugal, Chad. Many other countries have their names translated, as Germania for Germany, Chili for Chile, Usa for the United States or Chinia for China.

City names are treated as foreign words (London), except when part of the name itself is a regular noun or adjective: Nov-York (Nov for nova, or "new", but the place name York is not changed as in Esperanto "Nov-Jorko"). This is not a hard and fast rule, however, and New York is also acceptable, which is similar to writing Köln in English for the city of Cologne in Germany. South Carolina becomes Sud-Karolina, much in the same way that a river called the "Schwarz River" is not transcribed as the "Black River" in English even though schwarz is the German word for black. However, less well-known place names are generally left alone, so a small town by the name of "Battle River" for example would be written the same way, and not transcribed as "Batalio-rivero". This is because transcribing a little-known place name would make it nearly impossible to find in the original language.

Studies 
One study conducted with 20 college students at Columbia University circa 1933 suggests that Esperanto's system of correlative words is easier to learn than Ido's. Two other studies by the same researchers suggest no significant overall difference in difficulty of learning between Esperanto and Ido for educated American adults, but the sample sizes were again small: in the two tests combined, only 32 test subjects studied Ido. The researchers concluded that additional comparative studies of Esperanto and Ido are needed.

Esperanto and Ido were compared in studies at Columbia University circa 1933:

Number of speakers 
Esperanto is estimated to have approximately 100,000 to 2 million fluent speakers. In the same manner estimates for the number of Ido speakers are far from accurate, but 1,000 to a 5,000 is most likely. It is also important to note the distinction between the number of speakers compared to the number of supporters; the two languages resemble each other enough that a few weeks of study will enable one to understand the other with little difficulty, and there are a number of people that have learned Ido out of curiosity but prefer to support the larger Esperanto movement and vice versa.
The number of participants at the respective international conferences is also much different: Esperanto conferences average 2000 to 3000 participants every year whereas Ido conferences have around 10 participants each year. Each language also has a number of regional conferences during the year on a much less formal basis, and with smaller numbers.

Samples 
The Lord's Prayer:

Universal Declaration of Human Rights, Article 1

See also 
 Comparison between Ido and Novial
 Comparison between Ido and Interlingua
 Comparison between Esperanto and Novial
 Comparison between Esperanto and Interlingua
 Volapuk
 Esperanto
 Esperanto 1894
 Ido
 Novial
 Interlingua

References

External links 

Fundamento de Esperanto.
Kompleta Gramatiko Detaloza di la Linguo Internaciona Ido (Complete Detailed Grammar of the International Language Ido).
Plena Manlibro de Esperanta Gramatiko (A Complete Handbook of Esperanto Grammar).
Which IAL? A comparison of the two languages and others by a supporter of both and the IAL concept in general.
Why Ido?
Comparison at the Conlang Atlas of Language Structures

Esperanto
Ido language
Comparison of constructed languages